S8, S-8, or S 8 may refer to:

Routes
 S8 (Berlin), a S-Bahn line in Berlin, Germany
 S8 (Milan suburban railway network)
 S8 (Munich)
 Expressway S8 (Poland)
 S8 (RER Vaud)
 S8 (Rhine-Main S-Bahn)
 S8 (Rhine-Ruhr S-Bahn) in North Rhine-Westphalia, Germany
 S8 (ZVV), a S-Bahn line in the cantons of Zürich and Zug in Switzerland
 Short S.8 Calcutta, British transport flying boat
 Stagecoach Gold bus route S8, a bus route in Oxfordshire, England
 S8, a line in the Brussels Regional Express Network
 Line S8 (Nanjing Metro)

Other uses 
 S8 (classification), for disabled swimmers
 S-8 (rocket), a Russian air-to-surface missile
 S8: Keep container dry, a safety phrase in chemistry
 Samsung Galaxy S8, a smartphone by Samsung
 Samsung Galaxy Tab S8, a tablet computer by Samsung
 Octasulfur, the main allotrope of sulfur, having the formula S8
 Audi S8, German car